The Superior Court of the District of Columbia, commonly referred to as DC Superior Court, is the trial court for the District of Columbia, in the United States. It hears cases involving criminal and civil law, as well as family court, landlord and tenant, probate, tax and driving violations (no permit and DUI). All appeals of Superior Court decisions go to the District of Columbia Court of Appeals (though magistrate judge opinions are first appealed to a Superior Court Associate Judge).

History

The first judicial systems in the new District of Columbia were established by the United States Congress in 1801. The Circuit Court of the District of Columbia (not to be confused with the United States Court of Appeals for the District of Columbia Circuit, which it later evolved into) was both a trial court of general jurisdiction and an appellate court, and it heard cases under both local and federal law. Congress also established justices of the peace and an orphans' court, which were combined in 1870 into a new local court called the Police Court. The Police Court had jurisdiction over misdemeanors (concurrently with the federal courts) as well as equity powers. In 1909, Congress converted the Police Court into the Municipal Court, which became a court of record with jury trials in 1921. In 1963, Congress again converted the Municipal Court into the Court of General Sessions. Its jurisdiction was broader, although the federal courts retained concurrent jurisdiction in criminal cases. Under the District of Columbia Court Reform and Criminal Procedure Act of 1970, the Court of General Sessions was combined with the Juvenile Court (established in 1906) and the D.C. Tax Court (established as the local Board of Tax Appeals in 1937) to form the Superior Court of the District of Columbia, a trial court of general and mostly exclusive jurisdiction for D.C.

The court consists of a chief judge and 61 associate judges. The court is assisted by the service of 24 magistrate judges and retired judges who have been recommended and approved as senior judges. When a vacancy occurs on the court, the District of Columbia Judicial Nomination Commission invites applications. It sends three candidates' names to the President of the United States, who sends one nomination to the U.S. Senate for advice and consent. If the Senate confirms a judge, they serve for a 15-year term, which is renewable. The Superior Court and the D.C. Court of Appeals, known collectively as the D.C. Courts, comprise the judicial branch of D.C.'s local government.

In criminal cases, the government is represented by the Office of the United States Attorney for the District of Columbia or the Office of the Attorney General for the District of Columbia, depending on the nature and severity of the charges.

Organizational units
 Civil Division – Civil actions and actions in equity; handles temporary restraining orders other than those involving domestic violence.
Civil Actions Branch – Amount in controversy above $10,000 or cases requesting equitable relief such as declarative judgments, injunctive relief, writs of attachment
 Landlord and Tenant Branch – processes cases filed for possession of real property or violations of lease agreements. The Landlord-Tenant Resource Center can assist those who do not have an attorney. The Center is located in Room 115 of Court Building B (510 Fourth Street, NW) and is open weekdays, from 9:15 to noon.
 Small Claims and Conciliation Branch – Amount in controversy $10,000 and below. There is a Small Claims Resource Center to assist those without an attorney. It is located in Court Building B, Room 102, and is open from 9:15 to noon on Thursdays.
 Housing Conditions Calendar handles cases in which landlords are alleged to have not kept their rental property compliant with the D.C. Housing Code.
 Criminal Division – This division handles cases including misdemeanor, felony, and serious traffic offenses. The division also has Community Courts, which take a problem-solving approach to misdemeanor crimes, a drug court, and a mental health court.
 Family Court Operations Division – Family court
 Family Court Central Intake Center (CIC) – all cases are filed here.
 Domestic Relations Branch – divorce, legal separation, annulment, child custody, habeas corpus, and adoption
 Juvenile and Neglect Branch – juvenile delinquency, child abuse and neglect.
 Paternity and Child Support Branch – establishment of paternity, child support, and wage withholding
 Marriage Bureau – marriage licenses/records; applications to perform marriage ceremonies in the District of Columbia by authorized ministers and others
 Mental Health and Habilitation Branch – "hospitalization and continued treatment of persons adjudicated as mentally retarded or in need of mental health services"
 Counsel for Child Abuse and Neglect Branch is responsible for determining party eligibility for court-appointed counsel in child abuse and neglect proceedings and processes the appointment of attorneys for parties in these cases.
 Family Court Self Help Center – "provides legal information and assistance to self-represented parties in Family Court Cases."
 Family Treatment Court –"court-supervised, voluntary, comprehensive residential substance abuse treatment program for mothers/female caretakers whose children are the subject of a child neglect case."
 Domestic Violence Division – Domestic violence – Handles cases of violence by a family member or romantic partner, a person who shares living quarters, with whom one has a child in common, or between a former and current romantic partner. There are two intake centers: 1) the fourth floor of the Moultrie Courthouse, 2) the Medical Center at 1328 Southern Avenue, Suite 311. At either location, those seeking a protection order can meet with police/prosecutor, advocate, file a petition for a stay-away order and/or custody, seek the assistance of the Crime Victims Compensation Program, and talk with an advocate to develop a safety plan.
 Probate Division/Office of the Register of Wills – handles matters relating to estates of those who have died, guardianships and conservatorships for incapacitated adults, and other such matters.
 Probate Resource Center – those without an attorney can consult volunteer attorneys about probate matters at the Probate Resource Center in Room 316 of Court Building A (515 Fifth Street, NW) 8:30 to 3:30 Monday through Friday.
 Tax Division – Appeals and petitions for review of assessments made by the District of Columbia, as well as all proceedings brought by the District of Columbia for the imposition of criminal penalties according to the provisions of the District of Columbia Code
 Family Court Social Services Division – This division supervises juveniles who are awaiting trial on juvenile charges or who are on probation after pleading or being found involved in a crime.
 Multi-Door Dispute Resolution Division – Mediation and alternative dispute resolution services for those with court cases, as well as a Community Information Referral Program for disputes that have not yet resulted in a lawsuit being filed.
 Special Operations Division 
 Jurors Office
 Child Care Center
 Judge-in-Chambers
 Office of Court Interpreting Services

Active judges 
:

Vacancies and pending nominations

References

External links 
 DC Courts' official website

Superior Court
District of Columbia
District of Columbia
1970 establishments in Washington, D.C.
Courts and tribunals established in 1970